Regent's Park Open Air Theatre is an open-air theatre in Regent's Park in central London.

The theatre

Established in 1932, Regent’s Park Open Air Theatre is one of the largest theatres in London (1,256 seats) and is situated in Queen Mary’s Gardens in Regent’s Park, one of London’s Royal Parks. The theatre’s annual 18-week season is attended by over 140,000 people each year. In 2017, the theatre was named London Theatre of the Year in The Stage Awards, and received the Highly Commended Award for London Theatre of the Year in 2021.

Awards

†also for The Crucible

The Venue's History

In 1932 The New Theatre (now the Noel Coward) was left without a show after the early closure of a play by Mussolini. Robert Atkins and Sydney Carroll presented a ‘black and white’ production of Twelfth Night which subsequently transferred to a makeshift theatre in Regents Park, thus establishing Regent’s Park Open Air Theatre.

Many stars of the future have performed at the theatre. One of the first was in 1936 when Vivien Leigh played Anne Boleyn in Henry VIII, three years before she found fame in Gone with the Wind. Subsequent household names to appear at Regent’s Park include: Bernard Bresslaw, Judi Dench – who would go on to have a long relationship with the theatre and is currently Patron – Kate O’Mara, Lesley Garrett, Richard E. Grant, Ralph Fiennes, Hugh Bonneville, Damian Lewis, Eileen Atkins, Benedict Cumberbatch, Sheridan Smith and many more.

In 1939, Regent’s Park Open Air Theatre and the Windmill Theatre were the only two theatres to remain open throughout the War.

In 1963 David Conville and David William established the New Shakespeare Company as a non-profit distributing company. Laurence Olivier was one of the key investors. Conville remained associated with the theatre for 50 years, and following his death in 2018 Artist Lee Simmons was commissioned to design a sculpture that was erected in the grounds of the theatre.

The New Shakespeare Company became Regents Park Theatre Ltd in 2010, acknowledging the move away from producing Shakespeare-only plays.

The theatre’s current fixed amphitheatre-style auditorium was constructed in 1974 with numerous refurbishments leading to the venue as it stands today – which boasts the longest bar in the West End.

There have been many significant productions in the theatre’s history including a gala performance in celebration of the Golden Jubilee (attended by HM The Queen and HRH The Duke of Edinburgh), the theatre’s first original musical, Bashville.

In 2015 the theatre launched its own digital archive to enable audiences to explore all of the productions across its history. The archive continues to be updated.

Management

Key Productions

In 2007 Timothy Sheader was appointed Artistic Director and joined Executive Director William Village as Joint Chief Executive. They embarked on programming that would extend the plays presented at the theatre beyond the works of Shakespeare. The first of these was The Importance of Being Earnest. Other works included The Crucible, To Kill a Mockingbird, Lord of the Flies, Pride and Prejudice, Hobson’s Choice, All My Sons, The Seagull and Peter Pan.

In 2008 A Midsummer Night’s Dream re-imagined for everyone aged six and over was the first ‘re-imagined’ production at the venue especially created for children. This was followed by various subsequent ‘re-imagined’ titles including Macbeth (2010) Pericles (2011), and Oliver Twist (2017).

Timothy Sheader and William Village also produced a series of critically acclaimed musicals including Hello, Dolly!, Into the Woods, Crazy for You, The Sound of Music, Porgy and Bess, Seven Brides for Seven Brothers, Jesus Christ Superstar, On The Town, Little Shop of Horrors, Evita and Carousel.
Shakespeare remained part of the programming and, in 2016, Michelle Terry, who went on to become Artistic Director of Shakespeare’s Globe, played the title role of Henry V. 
In 2016, the co-production of Michael Morpurgo’s Running Wild (with Chichester Festival Theatre) brought new writing to the Open Air Theatre; the production included young people drawn from the local community. Two years later, the venue would co-produce its first opera with English National Opera: The Turn of the Screw. This partnership led to the 2019 production of Humperdinck’s Hansel and Gretel which included an ensemble of children from the Pimlico Musical Foundation.

In 2020, Regent’s Park Open Air Theatre was the first to open during the coronavirus pandemic with a socially distanced production of Jesus Christ Superstar: The Concert.

Beyond the Park

Various Open Air Theatre productions have gone on to be presented beyond the theatre itself. The first overseas transfer was of the 1956 productions of Hamlet and Twelfth Night when the theatre was invited to perform at the Baalbek Festival in Lebanon. In 2011, Crazy For You transferred to the West End’s Novello Theatre and, the following year, Timothy Sheader and Liam Steel re-directed their 2010 production of Into The Woods in Central Park, New York for The Public Theatre.

Productions that have toured the UK following seasons at the Open Air Theatre include: The Pirates of Penzance, High Society, To Kill A Mockingbird (also a month-long residency at the Barbican Centre), Lord of the Flies, Running Wild and Pride and Prejudice.

The most widely seen production from Regent’s Park Open Air Theatre is the 2016 production, Jesus Christ Superstar. After a second sell-out season in 2017, the production played a limited engagement at the Lyric Opera of Chicago in 2018 before transferring to the Barbican in 2019. The show is currently touring North America.

References

 Guide to British Theatres 1750–1950, John Earl and Michael Sell, pp. 129–130 (Theatres Trust, 2000). .

External links

Theatres in the City of Westminster
1932 establishments in England
Outdoor theatres
Producing house theatres in London
Regent's Park
Buildings and structures in Regent's Park